But I Don't Want to Get Married! is a 1970 American made-for-television comedy film starring Herschel Bernardi, Shirley Jones, Brandon Cruz, Nanette Fabray and June Lockhart. It was aired on October 6, 1970 in the ABC Movie of the Week space.

Plot
A widower meets a bunch of women who want to get married.

Cast
 Herschel Bernardi as Walter Benjamin
 Shirley Jones as Evelyn Harris
 Brandon Cruz as Bernard
 Nanette Fabray as Mrs. Vale
 June Lockhart as Hope
 Tina Louise as Miss Spencer
 Sue Lyon as Laura
 Harry Morgan as Mr. Good
 Joyce Van Patten as Olga
 Kay Medford as Hallie
 Kathleen Freeman as Mrs. Borg
 Jerry Paris as Harry

References

External links

1970 television films
1970 films
1970s English-language films
ABC Movie of the Week
1970 comedy films
American comedy television films
Films scored by George Duning
Films directed by Jerry Paris
1970s American films